A pinspeck camera is the optical reverse of a pinhole camera: a small (point-like) obstruction (the speck) is placed in front of the film where the (pin) hole would be in a pinhole camera. (The dark screen is “replaced” by the transparent nothing around the speck.)

Whereas in a pinhole camera the hole allows rays of light from different parts of the scene to reach different parts of the film, the obstruction in the pinspeck camera causes the shadow of different points in the scene to fall on different points on the film. The result is a negative image.

External links
 Jearl Walker The Pleasure of the Pin Hole Camera and Its Relative the Pinspeck Camera
 Adam Lloyd Cohen Anti-pinhole imaging Optica Acta: International Journal of Optics Volume 29, Issue 1, 1982

Cameras by type